Archive for History of Exact Sciences is a peer-reviewed academic journal currently published bimonthly by Springer Science+Business Media, covering the history of mathematics and of astronomy observations and techniques, epistemology of science, and philosophy of science from Antiquity until now. It was established in 1960 and the current editors-in-chief are Jed Z. Buchwald and Jeremy Gray.

Abstracting and indexing 
The journal is abstracted and indexed in:

According to the Journal Citation Reports, the journal has a 2020 impact factor of 0.594.

References

External links 
 

History of science journals
Springer Science+Business Media academic journals
Bimonthly journals
English-language journals
Publications established in 1960